To Duck or Not to Duck is a 1943 Warner Bros. Looney Tunes cartoon directed by Chuck Jones. The cartoon was released on March 6, 1943, and stars Daffy Duck and Elmer Fudd.

Plot
Elmer Fudd is hunting ducks with his dog Laramore. After missing Daffy several times ("Confidentially, those hunters couldn't hit the broad side of a DUCK!" snickers Daffy to the audience) and leaving a duck-shaped hole in the clouds after each shotgun blast, Elmer manages to graze Daffy with a load of buckshot; this merely blows off his tail-feathers but causes him to fall. Laramore ensures there is a pillow waiting to cushion Daffy's landing. Daffy then gives the dog a lesson in how to retrieve a duck while calling him "Rover", but later opens the dog's mouth to climb into and play dead. When Laramore takes the duck to Elmer, Elmer apologizes for shooting him, explaining that he had to "pwug" Daffy because he is "a gweat spoowtsman". An indignant Daffy sits up and heatedly retorts that Elmer doesn't know the meaning of fair play ("What chance has a poor little fluffy winged creature like me against a well-equipped hunter like you?!") and adds that Elmer wouldn't be so tough without various accoutrements, including his big shotgun, knife and even his hunter's apparel - which Daffy actually removes from Elmer. He finishes his tirade asking what protection he has got ("A bullet-proof vest, I suppose!") and inadvertently opens his feathered chest to reveal one ("How did that get there?"). Subsequently, he challenges Elmer to a "fair" fight.

Intimidatingly, Daffy maneuvers Elmer into a boxing ring which is surrounded by many duck spectators. The burly referee of the fight is also a duck, named Ducky Wheeze. He struggles to stop laughing at pathetic Elmer long enough to introduce him; when he finally does, Elmer stands up and meekly says, "Hewwo". The crowd boos overwhelmingly; only Laramore, from separate and otherwise empty bleachers, cheers; he is immediately knocked over by various objects thrown at him from the crowd.

The referee gives Daffy "Good to His Mother" Duck a resounding, loving introduction. The duck spectators cheer wildly; Laramore, back in his spot in the separate and otherwise empty bleachers, boos; he is again knocked over by thrown objects.

Before the match starts, the referee exhorts the two opponents to "fight clean", turning to wink at the duck spectators who, knowing what is coming, collectively shout, "Oh, brother!" The referee then calls "no rough stuff -- none of THIS! Or THIS! Or like SO!", each time demonstrating an illegal move on Elmer and knocking him silly. Daffy, in turn, picks up where the referee left off, asking, "You mean none of THIS? Or THIS?", manhandling (or duckhandling) Elmer similarly, and leaving him beaten up. At this point, Laramore suggests that there is "something awfully screwy about this fight, or my name isn't Laramore. And, it isn't".

As Elmer is slouched in his corner, Daffy beats up on him once more before the referee calls them out to shake hands. Daffy manipulates Elmer into "choosing" which of Daffy's hands to shake, and the result is Elmer being bashed on the head with a hammer. He falls to the mat as the referee rings the bell for Round 1, then rushes over to provide a ridiculously fast ten-count. He then declares Daffy Duck the winner and new champion.

Elmer, perplexed, walks over and says, "I'm not the one to compwain, Mr. Wefewee, but I thought you said no wough stuff! None of THIS! Or THIS! Or wike SO!" as he demonstrates the same illegal moves which were exhibited on him earlier on both the referee and Daffy.

Home media
VHS - Daffy Duck and Company
VHS - Looney Tunes: The Collector's Edition: Porky and Daffy
Laserdisc - Golden Age of Looney Tunes Vol. 2
DVD - Looney Tunes Golden Collection: Volume 6

See also
 Looney Tunes and Merrie Melodies filmography (1940–1949)
 List of films in the public domain in the United States
 List of cartoons featuring Daffy Duck
 List of cartoons featuring Elmer Fudd

References

External links

To Duck or Not To Duck at the Big Cartoon DataBase
Watch To Duck or Not to Duck in fully restored HD at Laugh Bureau Vintage
 in high definition, with closed captions.

1943 films
1943 short films
1943 animated films
1940s Warner Bros. animated short films
American boxing films
Boxing animation
Looney Tunes shorts
Daffy Duck films
Elmer Fudd films
Animated films about dogs
Short films directed by Chuck Jones
Films produced by Leon Schlesinger
Films scored by Carl Stalling
Warner Bros. Cartoons animated short films